Len Fontes (March 8, 1938 – May 8, 1992) was an American football coach. He served as an assistant coach for the Cleveland Browns, New York Giants and Detroit Lions.

Oldest brother of former NFL coach Wayne Fontes, He died of a heart attack on May 8, 1992, in Rochester Hills, Michigan at age 54.

References

1938 births
1992 deaths
Ohio State Buckeyes football players
Eastern Michigan Eagles football coaches
Dayton Flyers football coaches
Navy Midshipmen football coaches
Miami Hurricanes football coaches
Cleveland Browns coaches
New York Giants coaches
Detroit Lions coaches